The Mavericks is the first album by the American country music band The Mavericks. It was released in 1990 on the Miami, Florida-based Y&T Music label. Written entirely by the lead singer, Raul Malo, it is their only album with the guitarist Ben Peeler. "This Broken Heart", the only official single from this album, failed to chart. "I Don't Care If You Love Me Anymore" was later released on the soundtrack to the 1996 film Michael, and was a low-charting country single that year. "Mr. Jones", "The End of the Line (Jim Baker)", "This Broken Heart" and "A Better Way" were re-recorded in 1992 on the band's first major-label album From Hell to Paradise.

Track listing
All songs written by Raul Malo.
"You'll Never Know" – 2:54
"The End of the Line (Jim Baker)" – 3:34
"This Broken Heart" – 4:16
"Mr. Jones" – 3:25
"Tomorrow Never Comes" – 3:18
"The Lonely Waltz" – 4:27
"Watch Over Me" – 2:47
"A Better Way" – 4:10
"Another Lonely Life (Paul's Song)" – 4:23
"I Don't Care If You Love Me Anymore" – 4:18
"Keep Moving On" – 3:18
"I'll Give You Back (When You Belong to Me)" – 4:14
"Strength to Say Goodbye" – 2:46

Personnel

The Mavericks
Paul Deakin- drums
Raul Malo- acoustic guitar, electric guitar, bass guitar, piano, lead vocals
Ben Peeler- banjo, dobro, acoustic guitar, electric guitar, steel guitar, lap steel guitar, mandolin
Robert Reynolds- bass guitar, screams, sound effects, background vocals

Additional Personnel
Dennis Hetzendorfer- accordion
Steve Newton- bass guitar
Froilan Sossa- background vocals
Debbie Spring- fiddle
Homer Willis- harmonica

References

External links
 http://www.discogs.com/Mavericks-The-Mavericks/master/455585

1990 debut albums
The Mavericks albums